The Czech Republic is a source, transit, and destination country for people subjected to human trafficking, both women in forced prostitution,  and men and women working in forced labor. Women from the Czech Republic, Slovakia, Ukraine, Russia, Romania, Bulgaria, Vietnam, Mongolia, and Brazil are subjected to forced prostitution in the Czech Republic and also travel through the Czech Republic en route to forced prostitution in other European countries, including Austria, Germany, Switzerland, and Serbia. Many Roma women from the Czech Republic are subjected to forced prostitution domestically as well as abroad. Men and women from Russia, Ukraine, Kyrgyzstan, Uzbekistan, Romania, Vietnam, Mongolia, Thailand, and Belarus are subjected to forced labour in the construction, forestry, agricultural, and service sectors and are exploited within and transited through the Czech Republic to other countries in the European Union. Czech citizens are also subjected to forced labour in the United Kingdom.

The Czech government amended its criminal code to increase the maximum penalty for trafficking from 15 to 16 years’ imprisonment, and provides assistance to victims of trafficking both within the Czech Republic and also in source countries, described by the US State Department as "excellent". In 2009, the government provided approximately $456,000 in funding for its domestic anti-trafficking programs, including $213,000 for victim assistance. U.S. State Department's Office to Monitor and Combat Trafficking in Persons placed the country in "Tier 1"  in 2017.

Prosecution
The Czech government's record on law enforcement related to human trafficking is mixed. The Czech Republic prohibits trafficking for commercial sexual exploitation and labour exploitation through Sections 232a and 204 of its criminal code, and punishments prescribed under these statutes range from two to 15 years’ imprisonment, commensurate with those prescribed for other serious crimes, such as rape. In January 2010, a new section of the criminal code – Section 166 – came into effect and increased the maximum penalty prescribed for trafficking to 16 years. This Section includes some elements that are not considered as human trafficking by all jurisdictions, such as forced military service. In 2009, police conducted 47 investigations – including three labour trafficking investigations – a decrease from 81 investigations in 2008. The same year authorities prosecuted 115 people for trafficking offences (compared with 110 in 2008), leading to 83 convictions, an increase from 64 in 2008. Of those convicted in 2009, only those convicted under Section 204, related to pimping, were sentenced to time in prison, and the number of convicted traffickers given a prison sentence decreased compared to the previous year. In 2009, only 23 percent (19 out of 83) trafficking offenders convicted served time in prison, down from 28 percent in 2008 (18 out of 64). In 2009, two traffickers were sentenced to between 15 and 25 years in prison, 16 were sentenced to one to five years, and one of those convicted was imprisoned for less than a year. In 2009, the police provided 12 training seminars to 431 seasoned officers and cadets focused on investigation techniques as well as victim identification for both sex and labor trafficking offenses.

Protection
According to the US State Department, the Czech government makes strong efforts to protect and assist victims of human trafficking, using formal victim identification procedures and a mechanism for referring victims to NGOs for assistance. The government funds a "Program of Support and Protection of Victims of Trafficking in Human Beings", available for both foreign and Czech victims, and provides for both short-term and longer-term assistance. Foreign and Czech victims are offered an automatic 60-day period of reflection, during which time they receive government-funded assistance through NGO providers while they decide whether to cooperate with law enforcement in the criminal investigation. Victims are encouraged to assist in investigations and prosecutions. Foreign victims who cooperate with investigators after the initial 60-day reflection period are granted temporary residence and work visas for the duration of the relevant legal proceedings. Upon conclusion of the court proceedings, qualifying victims have the opportunity to apply for permanent residency. Victims are not fined or otherwise penalized for unlawful acts committed as a result of being trafficked.

Prevention
According to the US State Department, the government "demonstrates sustained, strong efforts to prevent trafficking domestically and it continues to dedicate significant resources to prevent trafficking in designated foreign countries". Working together with the International Organisation for Migration (IOM), the Ministry of Foreign Affairs allocates funding (around $132,500 between January 2008 and April 2010) to NGOs to raise awareness of trafficking among Mongolian labour migrants and protect Mongolian victims of both forced sex and forced labour exploitation in the Czech Republic and of those repatriated to Mongolia. Domestically, the Ministry of Interior funds an NGO to conduct a campaign to raise awareness of forced labour among foreign workers in factories, especially among the Vietnamese community. The government also funds NGOs to conduct general trafficking awareness campaigns in schools and in asylum and migration centers. The government funds a campaign called "Say it for Her", aimed at reducing the demand for prostitution among foreign tourists visiting the Czech Republic. The Czech Republic became a party to the 2000 UN TIP Protocol in 2014.

See also 
Human trafficking in Europe

References

Czech Republic
Czech Republic
Human rights abuses in the Czech Republic
Crime in the Czech Republic by type